This is a list of television channels that broadcast in Bosnian language:

List of television channels in Bosnia and Herzegovina

References

Bosnian
Media
Television channels
Communications in Bosnia and Herzegovina